Khao Chang Phueak is a mountain in Thailand's Thong Pha Phum National Park. It is in Pilok Subdistrict, Thong Pha Phum District, Kanchanaburi Province.

An  trail ascend to the mountain's summit. Visitors who intend to hike the trail must first register with Thong Pha Phum National Park officials, and the number of visitors to Khao Chang Phueak is limited to 60 persons per day.

References 

Mountains of Thailand
Tourist attractions in Kanchanaburi province
Geography of Kanchanaburi province